Henry Thomas Hartley Wyper (8 October 1900 – 1974) was a Scottish footballer who played in the Football League for Accrington Stanley, Bristol Rovers, Charlton Athletic, Chester, Hull City, Queens Park Rangers and Southport.

References

1900 births
1974 deaths
Scottish footballers
Association football forwards
English Football League players
Southport F.C. players
Motherwell F.C. players
Burnley F.C. players
Burscough F.C. players
Accrington Stanley F.C. (1891) players
Hull City A.F.C. players
Arsenal F.C. players
Charlton Athletic F.C. players
Queens Park Rangers F.C. players
Chester City F.C. players
Bristol Rovers F.C. players
Macclesfield Town F.C. players
Crewe Alexandra F.C. players
Rossendale United F.C. players